The Cribbar (Cornish - kribow: reefs), also known as the Widow Maker, is a reef off the Towan Headland in Newquay, Cornwall, England, United Kingdom.

The Cribbar is best known for creating annual big waves, popular with experienced big wave surfers from across the world. The Zorba is a reef  further off the coast and can create even higher waves.

Surfing
The Cribbar was first surfed in 1966 by  Ric Friar and Australians Pete Russell and Johnny McElroy as well as American Jack Lydgate. In January 2016, 15 year old Kamron Matthews became youngest human known to surf Cribbar.

References

External links

Location and webcam for the Cribbar

Geography of Cornwall
 
Newquay
Big wave surfing
Reefs of the United Kingdom